Adam Oller (born October 17, 1994) is an American professional baseball pitcher for the Oakland Athletics of Major League Baseball (MLB). He was drafted by the Pittsburgh Pirates in the 20th round of the 2016 Major League Baseball draft.

Amateur career
A native of Conroe, Texas, Oller attended Concordia Lutheran High School in Tomball, Texas where he was a teammate of current major leaguer Glenn Otto. As a senior, Oller helped the Crusaders reach the State Championship Game and was named all-state at both pitcher and catcher. Oller was also a standout football player and was named to the all-state team twice during his high school career.

Oller played college baseball at Northwestern State University, where in addition to pitching, he played catcher. In 2015, he played collegiate summer baseball with the Falmouth Commodores of the Cape Cod Baseball League, becoming the first NSU player invited to play in the league since 2010.

At NSU, Oller earned second-team All-America honors from Collegiate Baseball Magazine and third-team honors from the American Baseball Coaches Association following the 2016 season. Oller concluded his Demons career ranked fourth in career innings pitched (310 1-3), career ERA (2.06) and career starts (43), eighth in career wins (20) and ninth in career winning percentage (.741). He holds single-season top-10 marks in innings pitched (109.2, 2nd and 108.1, 3rd), ERA (1.23, 5th) and winning percentage (.889, T-8th).

Professional career

Pittsburgh Pirates
Oller was drafted by the Pittsburgh Pirates in the 20th round of the 2016 Major League Baseball Draft. He signed with the Pirates for a $70,000 signing bonus. He made his professional debut for the rookie-level Bristol Pirates, posting a 4.45 ERA in 13 appearances. Oller spent the 2017 season with the Class A Short Season West Virginia Black Bears, pitching to a 1.59 ERA with 50 strikeouts in 45.1 innings pitched. In 2018, Oller split the year between the Low-A West Virginia Power and the High-A Bradenton Marauders, struggling to a 6.29 ERA with 68 strikeouts in 73.0 innings of work across 29 contests between the two teams. He was released by the Pirates organization on November 6, 2018.

Windy City ThunderBolts
On January 4, 2019, Oller signed with the Windy City ThunderBolts of the independent Frontier League. He made 4 appearances (all starts) for Windy City, posting a 2-1 record and stellar 0.67 ERA with 45 strikeouts in 27.0 innings of work.

San Francisco Giants
On May 27, 2019, Oller signed a minor league contract with the San Francisco Giants organization. He spent the remainder of the year with the Single-A Augusta GreenJackets, logging a 5-6 record and 4.02 ERA with 93 strikeouts in 17 starts for the team.

New York Mets
On December 12, 2019, Oller was selected by the New York Mets in the minor league phase of the Rule 5 Draft. Oller did not play in a game in 2020 due to the cancellation of the minor league season because of the COVID-19 pandemic. He split the 2021 season between the Double-A Binghamton Rumble Ponies and the Triple-A Syracuse Mets, pitching to a 9-4 record and 3.45 ERA with 138 strikeouts in 120.0 innings of work across 23 starts between the two affiliates. The Mets added him to their 40-man roster following the 2021 season on November 19, 2021.

Oakland Athletics
On March 12, 2022, Oller and J.T. Ginn were traded to the Oakland Athletics in exchange for Chris Bassitt. On April 2, Oakland announced that Oller had made the Opening Day roster. Oller made his MLB debut on April 12 as the starting pitcher against the Tampa Bay Rays. Coincidentally, the starting pitcher for the Rays was Tommy Romero, who was also making his MLB debut in the game.

References

External links

1994 births
Living people
People from Conroe, Texas
Baseball players from Texas
Major League Baseball pitchers
Oakland Athletics players
Northwestern State Demons baseball players
Falmouth Commodores players
Bristol Pirates players
West Virginia Black Bears players
Bradenton Marauders players
Augusta GreenJackets players
Windy City ThunderBolts players
Sydney Blue Sox players
Binghamton Rumble Ponies players
Syracuse Mets players
Mat-Su Miners players
American expatriate baseball players in Australia
West Virginia Power players